Medal of Honor Day is a United States federal observance that is celebrated every year on March 25. It was created to honor the "heroism and sacrifice of Medal of Honor recipients for the United States." The holiday has been celebrated since  1991, when George H. W. Bush signed Public Law 101-564 on November 15, 1990, which was passed by the 101st United States Congress in November 1990, and created it. The holiday was chosen to be celebrated on March 25 to honor the 23 men who participated in the Great Locomotive Chase and received Medals of Honor for it, particularly William Bensinger, Robert Buffum, Elihu H. Mason, Jacob Parrott, William Pittenger, and William H. H. Reddick, who received the first six Medals of Honor on March 25, 1863. The law reads (in part):

References

External links

Annual events in the United States
Observances in the United States
March observances
Medal of Honor
Presidency of George H. W. Bush
Recurring events established in 1991